Firecrosser is a 2011 Ukrainian drama film directed by Mykhailo Illienko. The film was selected as the Ukrainian entry for the Best Foreign Language Oscar at the 85th Academy Awards, but it did not make the final shortlist.

Plot 
Little Ivan Dodoka witnesses how grain is taken from peasants in Chernychy Yar. After the collectivization and arrest of the priest, people sought consolation and guidance from his father Orestes, whose grandfather seemed to be a character. Secretly from the authorities, he keeps an icon in a hiding place in the house.

As an adult, Ivan joined the Red Army as a pilot. He is instructed to search for the missing pilot who crashed. Dodoka goes in search of nurse Lyubov Karimova and encounters a wolf near the scene of the accident. The nurse calms the wolf with mysterious words. Later, Ivan makes a proposal to Lyubov to marry and she agrees.

One day, Ivan gets on guard duty. He is visited by fellow villager Stepan Shulika, who says that his father was arrested for finding a hiding place. Stepan, taking the opportunity, flirts with Love and, when the German-Soviet war begins, begins to select the letters that Love writes to Ivan. Instead, he writes her own, hoping for reciprocity. On one of the flights, Ivan finds his beloved in his native village and they sign. The couple is visited by the fortune-teller Steph, who predicts that Ivan will become the head of the collective farm and have twelve children, but only one son from Lyubov.

Ivan wins the Golden Star, becomes a Hero of the Soviet Union, and goes on increasingly dangerous flights. Once his plane is shot down, Ivan is taken prisoner. When he is found, Ivan is thrown into the camp as a German spy for slandering Stepan.

Ten years later, Lyubov, not giving up hope of finding Ivan, turns to Stepan for help. He promises to find him if Love gives birth to a son, because Stepan's wife is barren. While in the camps, Ivan convinces the other prisoners that his father taught him to characterize. Superstitious prisoners obey him, and somehow Ivan shares with them plans to repay Stepan. News of these reaches Stepan, who invents how to kill an opponent. Ivan must be shot, allegedly trying to escape. But he escapes and gets to Karim, where Love comes from. Stepan, learning about the escape, guesses that Ivan will be there.

Cast
 Dmytro Linartovych as Ivan Dodoka
 Viktor Andriyenko as Smirnov
 Olha Hrishyna as Luba Karimova
 Oleksandr Ihnatusha as Ugrum-Ruka
 Ivanna Illienko as Shadow
 Oleksiy Kolesnyk as Indian Chief
 Vitaliy Linetskyi as Stepan Shulika
 Oleh Prymohenov as Naskrizny
 Galyna Stefanova as Baba Stefa
 Artem Antonchenko as Nikolai Eremin
 Marina Yurchak as Nadia Rakitina
 Mykola Boklan as Orest (Ivan's father)
 Serhiy Solovyov as Rakitin
 Iryna Bardakova as Margarita
 Denys Karpenko as Gerard
 Volodymyr Levytsky as Ugol
 Oleh Tsyona as Palloniy
 Serhiy Fedorenko as Starshyna
 Lev Levchenko as Vanya (son of Ivan)
 Yaroslav Bilonog as Little Ivan

Filming locations 
Most of the filming took place in Ukraine in 2008-2010. It filmed in Kyiv, Kyiv region, including a student campus near Rzhyshchev, in Kamianets-Podilskyi and its surroundings. They used the ruins of old buildings and a model airplane. One episode was filmed in the mountains on the border of Argentina and Chile.

See also
 List of submissions to the 85th Academy Awards for Best Foreign Language Film
 List of Ukrainian submissions for the Academy Award for Best Foreign Language Film

References

External links
 

2011 films
2010s historical drama films
Ukrainian historical drama films
Ukrainian-language films
Crimean Tatar-language films
2011 drama films